Jeong Sun-ok (born 16 February 1955) is a Korean former volleyball player who competed in the 1976 Summer Olympics.

References

1955 births
Living people
South Korean women's volleyball players
Olympic volleyball players of South Korea
Volleyball players at the 1976 Summer Olympics
Olympic bronze medalists for South Korea
Olympic medalists in volleyball
Medalists at the 1976 Summer Olympics
Asian Games medalists in volleyball
Volleyball players at the 1974 Asian Games
Medalists at the 1974 Asian Games
Asian Games silver medalists for South Korea
20th-century South Korean women